Marcus Manuel Hartog (19 August 1851, London – 21 January 1924, Paris) was an English educator, natural historian, philosopher of biology and zoologist in Cork, Ireland. He contributed to multiple volumes of the Cambridge Natural History.

Life
Hartog was born in London 1851, the second son of the Professor Alphonse Hartog (died 1904) and Marion (née Moss, 1821–1907), younger brother of Numa Edward Hartog and elder brother of Sir Philip Joseph Hartog, Academic Registrar of London University and Vice-Chancellor of the University of Dacca. His two younger sisters were the pianist and composer Cécile Hartog and the portrait painter Héléna Arsène Darmesteter,

Marcus Hartog was educated at the North London Collegiate School, University College, London, and Trinity College, Cambridge, where he took a first class in the National Science Tripos in 1874, and went out in the same year to Ceylon as assistant to the Director of the Royal Botanic Gardens — a post that he held for three years. On his return he became a demonstrator, and afterwards a lecturer in natural history at Owens College, Manchester. In 1882 he began an association of more than 40 years with the educational life of Cork. For 27 years he was Professor of Natural History at Queen's College, Cork (1882–1907), and in 1909 proceeded to the chair of Zoology in what had become University College Cork. When in 1921 he vacated the appointment, he was made Emeritus Professor.

Hartog was a Lamarckian. He argued for the inheritance of acquired characteristics and identified as a vitalist. He supported the non-Darwinian evolutionary ideas of Samuel Butler and wrote a supportive introduction to his book Unconscious Memory. He argued that cell division occurs due to a new force he termed "mitokinetism".

Hartog died in Paris on 21 January 1924.

Selected publications
Hartog contributed articles to the Dictionary of National Biography and the Encyclopædia Britannica, as well as writing many articles for scientific journals.

Problems of Life and Reproduction (1913)
The True Mechanism of Mitosis (1914)

Family
In 1874 in Paris, France, Hartog married Blanche Levy, daughter of R. Levy, of Paris, and had issue.

References

External links

1851 births
1924 deaths
19th-century British botanists
19th-century British zoologists
20th-century British botanists
20th-century British zoologists
Alumni of University College London
Alumni of Trinity College, Cambridge
Academics of Queens College Cork
Academics of University College Cork
English Jews
English people of French descent
Lamarckism
People educated at North London Collegiate School
Philosophers of biology
Vitalists